Monsignor Anton Agreiter, MHM (18 March 1934 − 15 October 2003) was a Catholic priest who served as the Apostolic Prefect of the Falkland Islands and Ecclesiastic Superior of St. Helena, Ascension Island and Tristan da Cunha since 1986 to 2002.

Life 
Agreiter was born in St. Leonhard near Brixen in Italian's autonomous province of South Tyrol in a German-speaking peasants family as the youngest, fifteenth son. In the young age he joined a society of apostolic life of Mill Hill Missionaries and was ordained as priest on 13 July 1958. In the beginning he was sent to Uganda before he was appointed Apostolic Prefect of the Falkland Islands and Ecclesiastic Superior of St. Helena, Ascension Island and Tristan da Cunha by Pope John Paul II on 1 October 1986.

References 

1934 births
2003 deaths
People from St. Leonhard in Passeier
20th-century Italian Roman Catholic priests
21st-century Roman Catholic priests
Falkland Islands Roman Catholics